Frank Pomeroy (born 27 July 1939) is a former Australian rules footballer who played with Geelong and North Melbourne in the Victorian Football League (VFL).

Notes

External links 

Living people
1939 births
Australian rules footballers from Victoria (Australia)
Geelong Football Club players
North Melbourne Football Club players